Terry Hester Leach (born March 13, 1954) is a former Major League Baseball pitcher, and author of the book, Things Happen for a Reason: The True Story of an Itinerant Life in Baseball.

Route to the majors
Leach played college ball at Auburn University, and was originally drafted by the Boston Red Sox in January , but the pick was voided. At which point, he signed with the unaffiliated Baton Rouge Cougars of the Gulf States League. With the Cougars, he was 2–0 with a 6.16 earned run average in five games. A year later, he signed with the Atlanta Braves as an undrafted free agent.

Leach went 19–23 as a minor leaguer in the Braves' farm system when he was released by the Braves July 23, . On July 27, he signed as a Free Agent with the New York Mets.

After a season and a half in the minors with the Mets organization, he made his major league debut at Wrigley Field on August 12, . With the Mets leading 4–2 over the Chicago Cubs, Leach surrendered a two-run home run to Mike Lum, tying the game. The Mets, however, came back to win the game in extra innings, 7–4.

Rick Ownbey was scheduled to start on October 1, the second to last day of the season. A blister on his throwing hand forced Mets manager George Bamberger to start Leach in his place. Leach ended up tossing a ten inning one-hitter against the Philadelphia Phillies; the only hit being a fifth inning triple by Luis Aguayo.

At the end of the season, he was dealt to the Chicago Cubs for two minor leaguers. At the start of the  season, he was dealt back to the Atlanta Braves for fellow minor league journeyman pitcher Ron Meridith. A month later, he was released; the following day, the Mets re-signed him.

New York Mets
Despite the fact that he spent much of 1986 in the minors, he was given a World Series ring in 1995, nine years after the series.

Leach did not allow a run in Spring training , but was still cut in the final week and sent back to the minors. However, Dwight Gooden's stint in a drug rehabilitation center coupled with Bob Ojeda being out for the season-ending surgery, opened a spot in the rotation for Leach. Leach responded with an 11–1 record and ten consecutive wins. Pitching exclusively out of the bullpen again a season later, Leach went 7–2 with a 2.54 ERA and three saves. In the 1988 National League Championship Series against the Los Angeles Dodgers, he pitched five innings without giving up a run.

Kansas City Royals
In June , the Mets traded Leach to the Kansas City Royals for Aquedo Vasquez. He went 5–6 with a 4.15 ERA in his only season in Kansas City.

Minnesota Twins
In , he made his second trip to the post season while with the Twins, and made two appearances in their World Series victory over the Atlanta Braves. In game three, he entered with the bases loaded and two outs, with the Twins trailing by three runs and the Braves having already scored twice in the inning. He struck out Mark Lemke to end the threat. In game five he pitched two innings, allowing one run. He would make a total of 105 regular season appearances in his two years with the Twins, posting ERAs of 3.20 and 3.61.

Chicago White Sox
Leach became a free agent after the Series, and signed with the Montreal Expos. The Expos released him during Spring training, and he signed with the Chicago White Sox. In , Leach was 6–5 with a 1.95 ERA for the ChiSox. He split  between the White Sox, their double-A affiliate and their triple-A affiliate.

Author
In , Leach wrote his autobiography, Things Happen for a Reason: The True Story of an Itinerant Life in Baseball with Tom Clark.

References

External links 
, or Baseball Gauge, or The Ultimate Mets Database, or Venezuelan Professional Baseball League

1954 births
Living people
Auburn Tigers baseball players
Auburn University alumni
Baseball players from Alabama
Baton Rouge Cougars players
Birmingham Barons players
Chicago White Sox players
Greenwood Braves players
Jackson Mets players
Kansas City Royals players
Kinston Eagles players
Leones del Caracas players
American expatriate baseball players in Venezuela
Major League Baseball pitchers
Minnesota Twins players
Nashville Sounds players
New York Mets players
Sportspeople from Selma, Alabama
Richmond Braves players
Savannah Braves players
Tidewater Tides players